Metals in their native state are those found chemically uncombined in nature. Most usable metallic ores in the Earth's crust are oxides or sulfides, and as such do not manifest the properties of refined metals. Occasionally, however, metals are found in uncombined metallic forms, in varying degrees of purity. These "metals found as metals" are referred to as being in their "native state". For example, native copper.

Metallurgy